Hypercallia halobapta is a moth in the family Depressariidae. It was described by Edward Meyrick in 1930. It is found in Brazil.

The wingspan is about 20 mm. The forewings are deep yellow suffusedly reticulated crimson irroration, the ground colour little apparent, the discal area reticulated brownish, with scattered black specks. The basal third of the costa is broadly suffused brownish and there is a white dot on the costa at two-fifths, followed by a dark fuscous dot, and a small elongate white mark on the costa at two-thirds, preceded by a dark fuscous dot. The discal stigmata are small and blackish, the first dot like, followed by slight yellow suffusion, the second transverse-linear, preceded similarly. There is an indistinct brownish line from the dorsum at one-third to beyond the first discal stigma, as well as a brown terminal fascia occupying one-third of the wing, towards the termen suffusedly irrorated violet-whitish. The hindwings are whitish-ochreous grey, posteriorly tinged yellowish and then suffused light brownish.

References

Moths described in 1930
Hypercallia